Fountain Creek Bridge is a limestone arch bridge which crosses Fountain Creek near Waterloo in Monroe County, Illinois, USA. The bridge was constructed in 1849 and served as a road bridge until the 1920s, when Illinois Route 156 opened on a new bridge. During the nineteenth century, stone arch bridges were commonly built in regions with stone quarries, such as Monroe County; roughly 100 stone bridges were built in the county. The Fountain Creek Bridge is the largest remaining stone arch bridge in the county and the second-largest which was only used by road traffic in the state.

The bridge was added to the National Register of Historic Places on December 22, 1978.

References

Buildings and structures in Monroe County, Illinois
Road bridges on the National Register of Historic Places in Illinois
Bridges completed in 1849
1849 establishments in Illinois
National Register of Historic Places in Monroe County, Illinois
Stone arch bridges in the United States